Regiane is a feminine Brazilian given name. Notable people with the name include:

Regiane Alves (born 1978), Brazilian actress and model
Regiane Bidias (born 1986), Brazilian volleyball player

See also
Regine

Brazilian given names
Feminine given names